Helen Mary Caldicott (born 7 August 1938) is an Australian physician, author, and anti-nuclear advocate. She founded several associations dedicated to opposing the use of nuclear power, depleted uranium munitions, nuclear weapons, nuclear weapons proliferation, and military action in general.

Early life and education
Helen Caldicott was born on 7 August 1938, in Melbourne, Australia, the daughter of factory manager Philip Broinowski and Mary Mona Enyd (Coffey) Broinowski, an interior designer.  She attended public school, except for four years at Fintona Girls' School at Balwyn, a private secondary school. When she was 17, she enrolled at the University of Adelaide medical school and graduated in 1961 with a MBBS degree. In 1962, she married William Caldicott, a paediatric radiologist who has since worked with her in her campaigns. They have three children, Philip, Penny, and William Jr.

Caldicott and her husband moved to Boston, Massachusetts, in 1966 and she entered a three-year fellowship in nutrition at Harvard Medical School. Returning to Adelaide in 1969, she accepted a position in the renal unit of Queen Elizabeth Hospital. In the early 1970s, she completed a year's residency and a two-year internship in paediatrics at the Adelaide Childrens Hospital to qualify as a paediatric physician so she could legitimately establish the first Australian clinic for cystic fibrosis at the Adelaide Childrens Hospital. The clinic now has the best survival rates in Australia. In 1977, she joined the staff of the Children's Hospital Medical Center in Boston as an instructor in pediatrics. She taught paediatrics at the Harvard Medical School from 1977 to 1980.

Anti-nuclear activism

Early activity

Caldicott's interest in nuclear issues was sparked when she read the 1957 Nevil Shute book On the Beach, a novel about a nuclear holocaust set in Australia.

In the 1970s, she gained prominence in Australia, New Zealand and North America, speaking on the health hazards of radiation from the perspective of paediatrics.  Her early achievements included convincing Australia to sue France over its atmospheric testing of nuclear weapons in the Pacific in 1971 and 1972, which brought the practice to an end. She also informed Australian trade unions about the medical and military dangers of uranium mining, which led to the three-year banning of the mining and export of uranium.

After visiting the Soviet Union in 1979 with an AFSC delegation and upon learning the impending US deployment of cruise missiles (which would end arms control) and Pershing II missiles that could hit Moscow from Europe in 3 minutes, Caldicott left her medical career to concentrate on calling the world's attention to what she referred to as the "insanity" of the nuclear arms race and the growing reliance on nuclear power. In 1978 she reinvigorated Physicians for Social Responsibility. Over time she and others recruited 23,000 physicians to this organisation which, through wide educational efforts, taught the US public about the dire medical implications of both nuclear power and nuclear war. In 1985 this national organisation and many others, she founded around the world were awarded the 1985 Nobel Peace Prize. She was herself nominated for the Nobel Prize by Linus Pauling, himself a Nobel winner.

In 1980, she founded the Women's Action for Nuclear Disarmament (WAND) in the United States, which was later renamed Women's Action for New Directions. It is a group dedicated to reducing or redirecting government spending away from nuclear energy and nuclear weapons towards what the group perceives as unmet social issues.

Caldicott stood as an independent candidate for the Australian House of Representatives at the 1990 federal election, contesting the Division of Richmond, against the Leader of the National Party, Charles Blunt. She polled 23.3% of the votes; not enough to win, but her preferences went mostly to the Labor candidate, Neville Newell, electing him and unseating Blunt.

In 2002 Caldicott released The New Nuclear Danger, a commentary on the George Bush Military-Industrial Complex.  The book was reviewed by Ivan Eland of The Independent Institute.  He wrote, "She makes many cogent criticisms about current and prior administrations’ nuclear policies and the excesses of the government-dominated military-industrial complex associated with nuclear weapons, but her often valid points are undermined by other far-fetched or alarmist arguments, sloppy research, and haphazard footnoting."

In 2008 Caldicott founded the Helen Caldicott Foundation for a Nuclear Free Future which, for over four years, produced a weekly radio commentary, "If You Love This Planet".

In April 2011, Caldicott was involved in a public argument in The Guardian with British journalist George Monbiot. Monbiot expressed great concern at what he saw as a failure by Caldicott to provide adequate justification for any of her arguments. Regarding Caldicott's book Nuclear Power is Not The Answer, he wrote: "The scarcity of references to scientific papers and the abundance of unsourced claims it contains amaze me." Caldicott falsely claimed, "As we have seen, he and other nuclear industry apologists sow confusion about radiation risks and, in my view, in much the same way that the tobacco industry did in previous decades about the risks of smoking."  Also in 2011, Caldicott made a written submission regarding the Darlington Nuclear Generating Station new build project in Canada in which she asserts that plutonium can cause cancer of the testicles after accumulation in these organs.

In 2014, Physicians for Social Responsibility hosted a lecture on "Fukushima's Ongoing Impact" by Caldicott in Seattle, Washington.

Honors and awards
Caldicott has been awarded 21 honorary doctoral degrees.  In 1982, she received the Humanist of the Year award from the American Humanist Association.  In 1992, Caldicott received the 1992 Peace Abbey Courage of Conscience Award at the John F. Kennedy Presidential Library in Boston for her leadership in the worldwide disarmament movement. She was inducted to the Victorian Honour Roll of Women in 2001. She was awarded the Lannan Foundation Prize for Cultural Freedom in 2003, and in 2006, the Peace Organisation of Australia presented her with the inaugural Australian Peace Prize "for her longstanding commitment to raising awareness about the medical and environmental hazards of the nuclear age". The Smithsonian Institution has named Caldicott as one of the most influential women of the 20th century.  She is a member of the scientific committee of the Fundacion IDEAS, a progressive think tank in Spain. She serves on the Advisory Council of the Nuclear Age Peace.  In 2009, she was designated a Women's History Month Honoree by the National Women's History Project.

Bibliography

Documentary films
Caldicott has appeared in numerous documentary films and television programs. In the early 1980s, she was the subject of two documentaries: the Oscar-nominated 1981 feature-length film Eight Minutes to Midnight: A Portrait of Dr. Helen Caldicott and the 1982 Oscar-winning National Film Board of Canada short documentary, If You Love This Planet.

A 2004 documentary film, Helen's War: Portrait of a Dissident, provides a look into Caldicott's life through the eyes of her niece, filmmaker Anna Broinowski.

Caldicott is featured along with foreign affairs experts, space security activists and military officials in interviews in Denis Delestrac's 2010 feature documentary Pax Americana and the Weaponization of Space.

The 2013 documentary Pandora's Promise also features footage of Caldicott, interspersed with counter-points to her assertions regarding the health impacts of the Chernobyl nuclear disaster.

See also
Propaganda
Antimilitarism
Anti-nuclear movement in Australia
Anti-nuclear movement in the United States
List of peace activists
Nuclear weapons and the United States
Nuclear-free zone
Nuclear-Weapon-Free Zone
Treaty of Rarotonga
Akhtar Naraghi
Michio Kaku

References

External links

www.helencaldicott.com - Helen Caldicott's official website
www.ifyoulovethisplanet.org - Helen Caldicott's weekly radio program, "If You Love This Planet"
Watch a video clip of Helen Caldicott at Big Picture TV
Video of Speech on Depleted Uranium from Freespeech.org
Anti Nuclear Oxford debate by former New Zealand PM David Lange
Heyoka Magazine Interview
KGNU Denver interview with Claudia Cragg in July 2007 about Japan's Nuclear Industry and Earthquakes
 by Caldicott
Nuclear power no answer to climate change
Helen Caldicott Papers at the Sophia Smith Collection, Smith College.

1938 births
Living people
Activists from Melbourne
Australian agnostics
Australian anti–nuclear weapons activists
Australian anti–nuclear power activists
Australian autobiographers
Australian humanists
Australian paediatricians
Women pediatricians
Australian political writers
Harvard Medical School faculty
Medical doctors from Melbourne
Non-fiction environmental writers
University of Adelaide Medical School alumni
Nonviolence advocates